Iwye is a city and former shtetl in Grodno Region, Belarus, located  east of Grodno.  It is a station on the railway line between Lida and Maladzyechna. The population of Iwye was 8,900 in 1995.

It was the site of a dangerous rescue mission by the Bielski Brothers in late 1942, as the Germans prepared to liquidate the ghetto, as the area was occupied during Operation Barbarossa.

People 
 Chaim Ozer Grodzinski, Rav of Vilnius, born in Iwye
 Moshe Shatzkes, Rav of Iwye, 1913–1941

Sights
 Saints Peter and Paul Church
 Old wooden mosque

External links 
 In memory of the Jewish community of Iwye
 Photos on Radzima.org
 Website of local television "Ивье ТВ"
 Iwye at United States Holocaust Memorial Museum
 

 
Lipka Tatars
Nowogródek Voivodeship (1919–1939)
Oshmyansky Uyezd
Populated places in Grodno Region
Shtetls
Towns in Belarus
Vilnius Voivodeship